The Zedriv GC2 is an electric 3-door city car made by Zedriv. It is essentially the 3-door variant of the Zedriv GC1.

Overview

The Zedriv GC2 was shown at the 2019 Auto Shanghai. It has 3 doors and 2 seats with dimensions of 3310 mm/1675 mm/1535 mm, a wheelbase of 2100 mm, a ground clearance of 120 mm, and a weight of 1050 kg. The price of the Zedriv GC2 ranges from ¥65,800 to ¥81,800.

Performance
The GC2 has a range of 230 miles, 74 horsepower, FWD, a 36.2 kWh battery, 120 km/h top speed, a 50km/h acceleration in 4.2 seconds.

See also
Zedriv GC1
Zedriv GT3
Zedriv GX5

References

External links
Official website

Cars introduced in 2019
Cars of China
Hatchbacks
Zedriv
Production electric cars